The Ukrainian Catholic Eparchy of Stamford is a Ukrainian Greek Catholic Church ecclesiastical territory or eparchy of the Catholic Church in New York State and New England in the United States. The episcopal see is Stamford, Connecticut, where the cathedra is found in St. Volodymyr Cathedral. The diocese publishes The Sower, a monthly newsletter with articles written in both English and Ukrainian, from its offices in Stamford.

The Eparchy of Stamford is a suffragan eparchy in the ecclesiastical province of the metropolitan Archeparchy of Philadelphia.

History
The Eparchy of Stamford was created in 1956 by Pope Pius XII. The territory was formerly administered by the Eparchate of Philadelphia. Bishop Ambrose Senyshyn of Stamford was named exarchate of the new eparchy. Senyshyn was president of the Ukrainian diocesan schools in Stamford, including the now-defunct St. Basil's Preparatory School.

Diocesan bishop (eparch)
The diocesan bishop (eparch) of the diocese is Bishop Paul Patrick Chomnycky, O.S.B.M.

St. Basil College Seminary
The Eparchy operates the tiny St. Basil College Seminary at 161 Glenbrook Road in Stamford. The college's mission is to educate and prepare men who desire to pursue a vocation to the priesthood for the Ukrainian Catholic Church. "St. Basil is the only Ukrainian Catholic liberal arts college, the only one of its kind outside of Ukraine fully accredited as a senior college by the State Board of Education," according to the Eparchy. Lubomyr Husar, Major Archbishop of the Ukrainian Greek Major-Archdiocese of Lviv, and one of the cardinals considered a possible successor to Pope John Paul II in 2005, was educated at St. Basil's College.

The college opened in September 1939. By 2007 it had graduated 130 students, of which 127 have been ordained to the priesthood, including six elevated to the episcopacy, and the current patriarch and head of the Ukrainian Catholic Church.

Most of the students have been Ukrainian Catholics interested in studying spirituality, the Ukrainian rite, Ukrainian history, civilization, language, and literature. In May 2007 three students graduated. The Connecticut Department of Higher Education, in the fall of 2005, reaccredited the college for another five years. The American Academy for Liberal Education also granted "institutional pre-accreditation" in 2005.

Preparatory school
The eparchy operated the St. Basil Preparatory School on the cathedral campus from 1933 to 1990. Alumni from the boys' high school typically have reunions every five years for each class. The school was founded by Archbishop Constantine Bohachevsky as "Ukrainian Catholic High School", and its alumni include more than 75 Ukrainian and Roman Catholic priests and two former Connecticut state judges.

Metropolia of Philadelphia for the Ukrainians

The eparchy is one of three suffragan eparchies of the Ukrainian Catholic Metropolia of Philadelphia, which also includes the Ukrainian Catholic Archeparchy of Philadelphia, the Ukrainian Catholic Eparchy of Parma, and the Ukrainian Catholic Eparchy of Saint Nicholas of Chicago.

Bishops

Ordinaries of this eparchy
Ambrozij Andrew Senyshyn, O.S.B.M. (1956-1961), appointed Archeparch of Philadelphia
Joseph Michael Schmondiuk (1961-1977), appointed Archeparch of Philadelphia
Basil Harry Losten (1977-2006)
Paul Patrick Chomnycky, O.S.B.M. (2006–Present)

Other priests of this eparchy who became bishops
 Lubomyr Husar (priest here, 1958–1972), consecrated bishop in 1977 (later a cardinal)
 Bohdan John Danylo, appointed Bishop of Saint Josaphat in Parma (Ukrainian) in 2014

List of parish locations in the Eparchy of Stamford

Connecticut

Stamford – Cathedral
Ansonia
Bridgeport
Colchester
Glastonbury
Hartford
New Britain
New Haven
Terryville
Willimantic

Massachusetts
Fall River
Ludlow
Jamaica Plain (Boston)
Pittsfield
Salem
South Deerfield

New Hampshire
Manchester

New York

Amsterdam
Auburn
Bedford Hills
Bronx
Brooklyn – North Fifth Street
Brooklyn – Nineteenth Street
Buffalo
Campbell Hall
Cohoes
Elmira Heights
Fresh Meadows
Glen Spey
Hempstead
Hudson
Hunter
Johnson City
Kenmore
Kerhonkson
Lackawanna

Lancaster
Little Falls
Lindenhurst
Long Island City
New York City – Manhattan
Niagara Falls
Ozone Park
Riverhead
Rochester – Carter Street
Rochester – Ridge Road East
Rome
Spring Valley
Staten Island
Syracuse
Troy
Utica
Watervliet
Yonkers

Rhode Island
Woonsocket

See also

Ukrainian Catholic National Shrine of the Holy Family
List of the Catholic cathedrals of the United States
List of the Catholic dioceses of the United States
List of bishops

Notes

External links
Ukrainian Catholic Eparchy of Stamford Official Site

Stamford
Ukrainian-American history
Stamford
Ukrainian-American culture in New York (state)
Culture of Stamford, Connecticut
Dioceses established in the 20th century
Ukrainian-American culture in Connecticut
Eastern Catholicism in Connecticut